Niagara Falls station may refer to:

Niagara Falls station (New York), an intermodal transit complex in Niagara Falls, New York, USA
Niagara Falls station (New York, 1978–2016), a former Amtrak station in Niagara Falls, New York, USA
Niagara Falls station (Ontario), a train station in Niagara Falls, Ontario, Canada

See also
Niagara Falls (disambiguation)